Muhammad Azarul Nazarith bin Azhar (born 2 July 1998) is a Malaysian professional footballer who plays as a centre-back for Malaysia Super League club Terengganu.

Born in Setapak, Kuala Lumpur, Azarul went to Sekolah Kebangsaan Wangsa Melawati and Victoria Institution.

References

External links
 

1998 births
People from Kuala Lumpur
Living people
Malaysian footballers
Felda United F.C. players
Terengganu FC players
Malaysia Super League players
Malaysian people of Malay descent
Association football defenders